In Greek mythology, the name Chloris (Greek Χλωρίς Chlōrís, from χλωρός chlōrós, meaning "greenish-yellow", "pale green", "pale", "pallid", or "fresh") appears in a variety of contexts. Some clearly refer to different characters; other stories may refer to the same Chloris, but disagree on details.

 Chloris, a nymph loved by Zephyrus (West Wind).
 Chloris, wife of Neleus, king of Pylos. It is, however, not always clear whether she or the below Chloris is mentioned in this role.
 Chloris, one of the Niobids.
 Chloris, daughter of Orchomenus, married the seer Ampyx (son of Elatus), with whom she had a child Mopsus who also became a renowned seer and would later join the Argonauts. The Argonautica Orphica calls her by a different name, Aregonis. In some accounts, she mothered Mopsus by Zeus.

See also 
 Family tree of the Greek gods
 410 Chloris

Notes

References 

Gaius Julius Hyginus, Fabulae from The Myths of Hyginus translated and edited by Mary Grant. University of Kansas Publications in Humanistic Studies. Online version at the Topos Text Project.
Pseudo-Apollodorus, The Library with an English Translation by Sir James George Frazer, F.B.A., F.R.S. in 2 Volumes, Cambridge, MA, Harvard University Press; London, William Heinemann Ltd. 1921. Online version at the Perseus Digital Library. Greek text available from the same website.
 Pseudo-Clement, Recognitions from Ante-Nicene Library Volume 8, translated by Smith, Rev. Thomas. T. & T. Clark, Edinburgh. 1867. Online version at theoi.com
 Publius Ovidius Naso, Fasti translated by James G. Frazer. Online version at the Topos Text Project.
 Publius Ovidius Naso, Fasti. Sir James George Frazer. London; Cambridge, MA. William Heinemann Ltd.; Harvard University Press. 1933. Latin text available at the Perseus Digital Library.
 The Orphic Argonautica, translated by Jason Colavito. © Copyright 2011. Online version at the Topos Text Project.

Consorts of Greek gods
Nymphs
Parents of demigods in classical mythology
Minyan characters in Greek mythology
Thessalian mythology